Beatriz Maria Bettanin Doria, better known as Bia Doria (born 8 May 1961), is a Brazilian plastic artist, and former First Lady of São Paulo (state), being married to former Governor João Doria.

Interview to Folha de S.Paulo 
In October 2016, soon after her husband had won the 2016 São Paulo mayoral election, Bia Doria gave an interview to Folha de S.Paulo newspaper where she stated not knowing famous places in São Paulo center region (mostly visited by poorer people) and that the Avanhandava Street (known for its fine dining restaurants) was the only place safe enough for one to walk on "as in New York". About the rampant social inequality of the city, she said something should be done to diminish the gap between the rich and the poor because "it's not good to have an employee with nutritional problems". She also mentioned she would never ride on São Paulo's bikeways due to safety issues. Besides the elitist tone of her declarations, she said she felt comfortable near poor people, and compared herself to Eva Perón. The interview was held inside her Porsche Cayenne.

The interview had wide negative repercussion for her and her husband's image. Bia's personal website was hacked the on same day the interview was published. After the episode, Bia Doria avoided giving further interviews.

References

|-

1961 births
Living people
First ladies of São Paulo (state)